Alisha Claire Mendoza del Campo (born September 20, 1999) is a Filipino footballer who plays as a forward for the Philippines women's national team.

Early life
Born on September 20, 1999 and native of Calauag, Quezon, Alisha del Campo started playing football at age 11, often joining her brother's team play the sport.

Career
Alisha del Campo plays for the De La Salle Zobel and has participated in the Women's National Collegiate Athletic Association and Rizal Football Association. At the PFF Women's League she played for Green Archers United and was among the top scorers of the 2016-17 season.

Having never played in any youth national team, del Campo debuted for the Philippines women's national football team at age 17 at the 2018 AFC Women's Asian Cup qualifiers in April 2017. She had her first international cap when she was brought in as a substitute in the Philippines' 4–0 win against the United Arab Emirates. She earned a place in the starting eleven in the match against Iraq. She scored a goal in the team's 1–5 loss to Jordan after she came in as a substitute in the 90th minute.

In the 2019 AFF Women's Championship, del Campo made her first hat-trick in the 4–0 rout against Singapore. The Philippines made their first semifinals appearance in that edition of the tournament.

She was also part of the Philippine national team that played at the 2017 Southeast Asian Games.

International goals
Scores and results list the Philippines' goal tally first.

Honours

International

Philippines
Southeast Asian Games third place: 2021
AFF Women's Championship: 2022

References

1999 births
Living people
Filipino women's footballers
Philippines women's international footballers
Women's association footballers not categorized by position
Competitors at the 2017 Southeast Asian Games
Competitors at the 2019 Southeast Asian Games
Southeast Asian Games bronze medalists for the Philippines
Southeast Asian Games medalists in football
Competitors at the 2021 Southeast Asian Games